The 1947 AAFC season was the 49ers' second season. They began the season hoping to improve upon the previous season's output of 9–5, and they had a similar output this season, 8–4–2. The team did have its first tie in franchise history, a 28–28 standoff in Week 6 against the Baltimore Colts. For the second time in as many seasons, the 49ers placed 2nd in the West division, coming one spot short of playing in the league championship game.

The team's statistical leaders included Frankie Albert with 1,692 passing yards, Johnny Strzykalski with 906 rushing yards, and Alyn Beals with 655 receiving yards and 60 points scored.

Schedule

Standings

References

San Francisco
San Francisco 49ers seasons
1947 in sports in California